Bitter, Fit Crack is the third full-length album from irreverent English punk rock band, The Macc Lads. It was released in 1987 and follows Beer & Sex & Chips n Gravy from 1985. Dave Thompson, writing for Allmusic gave the album 3.5 stars out of 5, while Johnny Eager of Underground magazine gave it a zero-rating, asking "does anybody buy this shoddy dross?".

Track listing 
 All songs written by Conning, O'Neill, and Moore, unless otherwise stated
 "Barrel's Round" 	–	1:53
 "Guess Me Weight"	–	2:46
 "Uncle Knobby" (Conning, O'Neill, Hatton)	–	3:09
 "Maid of Ale" - 2:41
 "Dan's Big Log" - 2:26
 "Got to be Gordon's" - 2:02
 "Bitter, Fit Crack"	–	2:12
 "Julie the Schooly"	–	2:35
 "Doctor, Doctor"	–	1:41
 "Torremolinos"	–	2:37
 "Al O'Peesha"	–	2:34
 "Feed Your Face"	–	3:00

1993 CD issue bonus track
 "Jingle Bells"

Credits 
 Muttley McLad – vocals, bass
 The Beater – guitar
 Chorley the Hord – drums
 Recorded on March 18, 1987 at The Cottage, Macclesfield, England
 Produced and engineered by Bald Eagle

References

External links 
 Macc Lads official discography

1987 albums
Macc Lads albums